Yudkin is a surname. Notable people with the surname include:

 Aleksei Yudkin (born 1981), Russian footballer
 John Yudkin (1910–1995), British physiologist and nutritionist
 Jonathan Yudkin (born 1960), American musician, record producer, arranger, and band leader

Russian-language surnames